Ibrahim ben Ramdan, also known as Baba Ibrahim, or simply Ibrahim III was the Dey (king) of Algiers from 1732 to 1745.

Early life 
He was Khaznadar (treasurer) under the previous dey, Baba Abdi.

Rule 
He was elected Dey on 3 September 1732.

His reign started off with a decisive defeat at the hands of the Spain during the Siege of Oran in 1732. This defeat led to the loss of the strategic city of Oran and Mers El Kébir, and Spain gaining a foothold in Algeria.

He gained a victory over the Beylik of Tunis during the Algerian-Tunisian war of 1735, securing the annual payment of 50,000 Piastres.

He abdicated in 1745, citing old age. His nephew, Ibrahim Kouchouk was elected as the next dey.

References 

Ottoman Algeria
Deys of Algiers
18th-century rulers in Africa
18th-century Algerian people
1745 deaths
Year of birth unknown